The collection of mosques in northern Côte d'Ivoire (also known as Ivory Coast) were built in a Sudanese style first brought to the Empire of Mali in the 14th Century. This collection of sites was added to the UNESCO World Heritage Tentative List on November 29, 2006 in the Cultural category, and inscripted in 2021.

Mosques names and locations 
 The Mosque of Kaouara, located in the Ouangolodougou Sub-Prefecture
 The Mosque of Tengréla, located in the Tengréla Sub-Prefecture
 The Mosque of Kouto, located in the Kouto Sub-Prefecture
 The Mosque of Nambira, located M’bengué Sub-Prefecture
 Two Mosques of Kong, located in the Kong Sub-Prefecture

References

External links
Mosquées de style soudanais du Nord ivoirien (site en série) - UNESCO World Heritage Centre Accessed 2009-02-24.
World Heritage Center: The Criteria for Selection

 
14th-century establishments in Ivory Coast
Archaeology of Ivory Coast
Ivory Coast
Mosques
Sudano-Sahelian architecture